Debris Linux (previously BeaFanatIX, BFX) was a small Linux distro based on Ubuntu, Knoppix and Debian with GNOME as window manager. The ISO-file was about 200 MB in size and worked as a Live CD. It was also possible to install it on the hard drive.

Origin 
In 2005 Steven Watsky (maker of BeatrIX) halted updates to BeatrIX due to his health deteriorating. As a result, the BeatrIX community fell apart. Stephan Emmerich wanted to continue the project, but since this was no longer possible with BeatrIX kon, he decided to make a new distro, based on BeatrIX, called BeaFanatIX. This was later renamed to Debris Linux.

Software 
BeaFanatIX supplied following packages:
GNOME, a windowmanager
Mozilla Firefox, a webbrowser
Beep, a mediaplayer
AbiWord, a text processor which is compatible with Microsoft Office
Gnumeric, a spreadsheet program
Evolution, an e-mailclient

Versions 
2006.1 final
2006.2 beta 1
2006.2 beta 2
2006.2 beta 3,4,5 (not for public)
2006.2 beta 6 (23 October 2006)
2006.2 final
2006.2 revision 4 (September 2007)
Debris 2.0 (2009)

See also 
 List of Linux distros

External links 
 Projectpage
 Debris archive and downloads

Debian